Haft Cheshmeh or Haftcheshmeh may refer to:

Ardabil Province
 Haft Cheshmeh, Ardabil, a village in Meshgin Shahr County

East Azerbaijan Province
Haft Cheshmeh, Azarshahr, a village in Azarshahr County
Haft Cheshmeh, Meyaneh, a village in Meyaneh County
Haft Cheshmeh, Shabestar, a village in Shabestar County

Ilam Province
 Haft Cheshmeh, Abdanan
 Haft Cheshmeh, Ilam

Kermanshah Province
 Haft Cheshmeh, Kermanshah, a village in Kermanshah County
 Haft Cheshmeh, Kuzaran, a village in Kermanshah County

Khuzestan Province
 Haft Cheshmeh, Khuzestan, a village in Behbahan County

Kohgiluyeh and Boyer-Ahmad Province
 Haft Cheshmeh, Bahmai, a village in Bahmai County
 Haft Cheshmeh, Kohgiluyeh and Boyer-Ahmad, a village in Boyer-Ahmad County
 Haft Cheshmeh, Gachsaran, a village in Gachsaran County

Lorestan Province
 Haft Cheshmeh, Delfan, a city in Delfan County
 Haft Cheshmeh, Dowreh, a village in Dowreh County
 Haft Cheshmeh, Khorramabad, a village in Khorramabad County
 Haft Cheshmeh, Kuhdasht, a village in Kuhdasht County
 Haft Cheshmeh, Pol-e Dokhtar, a village in Pol-e Dokhtar County

Semnan Province